Aero Car or Aerocar may refer to:

Automobiles 
 Aerocar (1905 automobile), an American automobile built from 1905 to 1908
 Aero Car (1919 automobile), a British 5/7 hp (533 W) flat twin-engine cyclecar manufactured from 1919 to 1920
 Aero Car (1921 automobile), a planned American automobile

Flying cars 
 Aerocar (1949–1956), several working "flying cars" (roadable aircraft)
 Wagner Aerocar, a roadable helicopter completed in 1965
 Aerocar 2000, a roadable aircraft currently in development in the US
 Klein Vision AirCar (2020-Present), a certified two-seat real flying car designed by Štefan Klein
 AeroMobil s.r.o. AeroMobil, sereral working "flying cars" produced 1990-Present

Light aircraft 
 Portsmouth Aerocar, a British light utility aircraft design of the late 1940s

Companies 
 Aerocar International, the company that built the Aerocar as well as:
 Aerocar Aero-Plane, an unusual light aircraft flown in the US in 1964
 Aerocar Coot, a two-seat amphibious aircraft first flown in 1969, designed for homebuilding by Moulton Taylor
 Aerocar Micro-IMP, a light sportsplane developed from the successful Mini-IMP homebuilt in 1978
 Niagara Aero Car Company, which built the Whirlpool Aero Car, an attraction at Niagara Falls, in 1913

See also 
 Flying car (disambiguation)
 Skycar (disambiguation)
 John Emery Harriman, designer